Qikiqtagafaaluk, formerly Admiralty Island, is an uninhabited, irregularly shaped Arctic island in the Kitikmeot Region of Nunavut, Canada. It is located in the Victoria Strait, south of Victoria Island's Collinson Peninsula.

References

Victoria Island (Canada)
Uninhabited islands of Kitikmeot Region